Trevor Moore (born March 31, 1995) is an American professional ice hockey left winger from Thousand Oaks, California currently playing for the Los Angeles Kings of the National Hockey League (NHL). While playing collegiate hockey with the University of Denver, Moore was named to the NCAA Second All-American Team and NCHC Forward of the Year. Moore helped lead the American Hockey League (AHL)'s Toronto Marlies to their first Calder Cup in 2018.

Playing career
Moore grew up in the Los Angeles area, where he played youth ice hockey for the Los Angeles Hockey Club. In high school he played with the Tri-City Storm, of the United States Hockey League, in Kearney, Nebraska. He then played three seasons with the University of Denver. In his freshman year, Moore was named to the NCHC All-Rookie Team. In his sophomore year, he was named to the NCAA Second All-American Team and NCHC Forward of the Year.

After his junior season, Moore signed with the Toronto Maple Leafs as an undrafted free agent on July 26, 2016. He subsequently joined the Maple Leafs' American Hockey League (AHL) affiliate, the Toronto Marlies, for the 2016–17 season after attending the Leafs training camp. In Moore's second season with the Marlies, 2017–18, he helped them earn their first Calder Cup.

On November 13, 2018, Moore was recalled to the Maple Leafs ahead of their West Coast road trip. He was sent back to the Marlies shortly after, but following an injury to Tyler Ennis, he was recalled again on December 23. Moore made his NHL debut that night in a 5–4 overtime win against the Detroit Red Wings, recording up his first career NHL point, an assist on a goal by Frédérik Gauthier. His first goal was scored four games later, on January 5, 2019, in a 5–0 win over the Vancouver Canucks. On January 13, Moore signed a two-year contract extension with the Maple Leafs.

During the 2019–20 season, on February 5, 2020, Moore (alongside third-round picks in 2020 and 2021) was traded by the Maple Leafs to the Los Angeles Kings in exchange for Kyle Clifford and Jack Campbell.

On July 24, 2021, Moore signed a two-year, $3.75 million contract extension with the Kings.

During the 2021–22 season, Moore achieved career bests in goals, points, and assists. He scored 5 short-handed goals, tying Alex Formenton for the NHL lead in short-handed goals that year.

On December 15, 2022, the Kings signed Moore to a five-year contract extension with an average annual value of $4.2 million.

Career statistics

Regular season and playoffs

International

Awards and honors

References

External links
 

1995 births
Living people
American men's ice hockey left wingers
People from Thousand Oaks, California
Ice hockey players from California
Denver Pioneers men's ice hockey players
Los Angeles Kings players
Tri-City Storm players
Toronto Maple Leafs players
Toronto Marlies players
Undrafted National Hockey League players
AHCA Division I men's ice hockey All-Americans